This article lists the governors of the Italian Islands of the Aegean, from 1912 to 1947. It includes Italian commanders and governors, as well as German commanders and British administrators of the Dodecanese during World War II and its aftermath.

Italy conquered the Dodecanese from the Ottoman Empire in 1912, during the Italo-Turkish War and ceded the islands to Greece in 1947, according to the Treaty of Peace.

List

(Dates in italics indicate de facto continuation of office)

See also
Italian Islands of the Aegean
Dodecanese
Rhodes
Italian colonists in the Dodecanese
Turks of the Dodecanese

External links
World Statesmen – Greece (Dodecanese Islands and Rhodes)

Aegean
Dodecanese under Italian rule
Italian Empire-related lists